Southern Conference Championship or Southern Conference Tournament may refer to:

List of Southern Conference football champions, the college football champions
List of Southern Conference men's basketball champions, the men's basketball champions of tournament and regular season
Southern Conference baseball tournament, the baseball championship tournament